Nekenčiu reklamos (literally: I hate commercials) is a Lithuanian comedy show, starring Rolandas Kazlas.

It consists of non-sense funny commercials and Pranas Rupšlaukis' life near television. There are 33 episodes, which were shown in 2000–2001.

References 

Lithuanian television series
2000s comedy television series
2000s Lithuanian television series
2000 Lithuanian television series debuts
2001 Lithuanian television series endings
BTV (Lithuania) original programming